was a Japanese film actor. He appeared in more than 200 films between 1935 and 1990. He starred in Entotsu no mieru basho, which was entered in the 3rd Berlin International Film Festival. His son is the singer and actor Yūzō Kayama.

Selected filmography

 Mr. Thank You (1936)
 What Did the Lady Forget? (1937)
 The Munekata Sisters (1950)
 Repast (1951)
 Entotsu no mieru basho (1953)
 Husband and Wife (1953)
 Sound of the Mountain (1954)
 Late Chrysanthemums (1954)
 Untamed (1957)
 A Rainbow Plays in My Heart (1957)
  (1958)
 Daughters, Wives and a Mother (1960)
 Mothra (1961)
 Chūshingura: Hana no Maki, Yuki no Maki (1962)
 Gorath (1962)
 Atragon (1963)
 Shin Hissatsu Shiokinin (1977, TV)
 Edo no Kaze (1980, TV)
 The Girl Who Leapt Through Time (1983)
 Film Actress (1987), Himself
 Choujinki Metalder (1987, TV), Ryūichirō Koga

References

External links

1909 births
1991 deaths
Japanese male film actors
People from Tokyo
Rikkyo University alumni
20th-century Japanese male actors